Michael Kaufmann (May 26, 1891 – June 3, 1949) was a Chicago businessman.

In the early 1920s, Kaufmann helped found the Autopoint Company. He helped pioneer the use of plastics to make mechanical pencils.  Around 1925, Kaufmann sold his holdings in Autopoint to the Bakelite Corporation.   Later, he invested in a machine shop and operated it.

1891 births
1949 deaths

20th-century American businesspeople
Businesspeople from Chicago